Ahmed Achour was a Tunisian conductor.

Biography
Achour was born in Hammam Lif. After studying law, he studied music and violin at the Tunis Conservatory of Music in Tunis in 1967 where he obtained the diploma of Arabic music and the Presidential Award for violin. He continued his musical studies at the Schola Cantorum in Paris, where he received degrees in several specialties: harmony, counterpoint, conducting and orchestral writing.

When he returned to Tunis in 1971, he joined the Tunisian Symphony Orchestra as first violin. In 1979, he became responsible for directing and administering and over the years worked with many international musicians. He then assumed the direction of the National Conservatory of Music in Tunis and the International Festival of Popular Arts.

Achour has presented numerous concerts with symphony orchestras in Moscow, St. Petersburg, Paris, Brive-la-Gaillarde, Rabat, Algiers and produced operas by Carl Maria von Weber, Abu Hassan, in Sofia (Bulgaria). He won the National Music Prize in 2005.

Death 
Achour died on Friday January 29, 2021, at the age of 75.

Works

References

1945 births
2021 deaths
Tunisian conductors (music)
Tunisian composers
People from Hammam Lif
Schola Cantorum de Paris alumni
20th-century classical composers
21st-century classical composers
Male classical composers
20th-century conductors (music)
21st-century conductors (music)
20th-century Tunisian male musicians
21st-century Tunisian male musicians